Eivind Ystrøm (born 1978) is a Norwegian psychologist, Professor (Chair) of Personality Psychology at the University of Oslo and Research Professor at the Norwegian Institute of Public Health. His research fields include genetics, substance use and personality, including intergenerational transmission of depression and other mental illnesses. According to Google Scholar, he has been cited 2,500 times in scientific literature and has an h-index of 26.

References

Living people
Norwegian psychologists
Academic staff of the University of Oslo
1978 births